The Vincent family have been described by The Times as a "family of career criminals [who] have a string of convictions for targeting elderly householders". They are part of a Gypsy community living in the county of Kent, England.

In 2011, Henry Vincent (born c. 1959) was jailed with his son, Henry Vincent Jr., for defrauding an 81 year old man by showing him a handful of maggots that he had brought with him to convince his victim that the joists of his roof were rotten. In April 2018, his wife Rosemary purchased the grade II listed Snagbrook House in Hollingbourne, Kent, from Dudley Wright for £325,000 compared with a market value estimated by The Times to be £1.7 million.

In April 2018, Henry Vincent junior died after he was stabbed by a pensioner whose home in Hither Green he was robbing with another man. The case caused a national sensation in which the ability of home-owners to defend themselves against intruders was debated after the homeowner was arrested on suspicion of murder. He was later released.

Also in April 2018, David Vincent and his son also David, an uncle and cousin of Henry Vincent junior, were jailed for defrauding a homeowner.

See also 
 Castle doctrine
 Defence of property
 Self-defence in English law
 Tony Martin (farmer)

References

External links
The Daily Telegraph

Living people
English fraudsters
English families
English criminals
Crime families
Year of birth missing (living people)